Battle of Acentejo may refer to two battles fought on Tenerife:

First Battle of Acentejo (May 1494), a Spanish defeat
Second Battle of Acentejo (December 1495), a Spanish victory